Michael Allan Ribers (born May 19, 1981) is a Danish professional football defender.

Ribers was called up for the league national team, which played a number of unofficial national team games in the United States, El Salvador and Honduras in January 2007, by national team manager Morten Olsen. He played the first game of the tour; a 3–1 defeat to the United States national team in Los Angeles, California.

External links
Danish national team profile
FC Nordsjælland profile
Brøndby IF profile
Career statistics

1981 births
Living people
Danish men's footballers
Allerød FK players
Brøndby IF players
Herfølge Boldklub players
FC Nordsjælland players
BK Skjold players
Association football defenders